is a railway station on the Kintetsu Utsube Line in Yokkaichi, Mie Prefecture, Japan, operated by the private railway operator Kintetsu. It is 5.0 rail kilometers from the terminus of the line at Kintetsu-Yokkaichi Station.

Lines
Kintetsu
Utsube Line

Layout
Ogoso Station has a single side platform for bidirectional traffic.

Platforms

Adjacent stations

History
Ogoso Station was opened on June 22, 1922 as a station on the Mie Railway. The station was closed in January 1944, and reopened in May 1959 as a station on the Mie Kotsu, which later became the Mie Electric Railway, and which merged with Kintetsu on April 1, 1965.

References

External links

 Kintetsu: Ogoso Station

Railway stations in Japan opened in 1922
Railway stations in Mie Prefecture